Driffield School & Sixth Form is a coeducational comprehensive school which is situated on Manorfield Road in Driffield, in the East Riding of Yorkshire, England. The school has nearly 1400 pupils aged 11–18, who come from rural communities in the Yorkshire Wolds.

History
In the 2011 Ofsted inspection Driffield School & Sixth Form was classed as grade 2, 'good'.  Overall effectiveness of post 16 provision was  classified as grade 3, 'satisfactory'.

In 2016 Headteacher Simon Jones resigned following a visit from Ofsted, after which the school was placed in 'Special Measures'. The Governing Body of the school then sought support from multi-academy trust The Education Alliance. It converted to an academy on 1 February 2017. Following a rapid period of improvement, Driffield School and Sixth Form was judged as a 'Good' school in all areas under the new Ofsted inspection framework in January 2020.

Description
Driffield School & Sixth Form is an 11–19 comprehensive school with approximately 1,800 students on roll. It is part of The Education Alliance, a growing multi-academy trust, currently consisting of this school, South Hunsley School and Sixth Form College, Malet Lambert School, The Snaith School, Hunsley Primary School, North Cave Church of England Primary School and Yorkshire Wolds Teacher Training.

Before converting it had had a series of deteriorating Ofsted assessments. There have been leadership changes and Ofsted found that it is a happy school where students feel safe.

The school has a purpose-built Art and Technology building and a Performing Arts block. The school's North building has had a £1.2 million refurbishment that also led to energy efficiencies. The school accesses the adjacent East Riding Leisure Centre, and the school's facilities are also used by the local community outside school hours.

Academics
The five year curriculum is taught in two key stages: Key Stage 3 in Years 7, 8 and 9 and Key Stage 4 in Years 10 and 11). Students study the core subjects, English, maths and science, alongside a wide range of non-core subjects. All students at Key Stage 3 study an hour of Achieving Personal Excellence (APEX) per week; these lessons focus on aspects of personal, social, health and economic education. They must also do two hours of PE.

In year 9 students proceed to the extended Key Stage 4. They continue to study the core subjects and do three targeted options. All students sit GCSEs at end of year 11. Somestudents are guided into a Vocational pathway where one of their three options will be a BTEC Level 2 in Digital Information Technology, Engineering, Enterprise and Marketing, Health and Social Care or Sports Studies.

The sixth form have separate facilities and a separate dining hall.

Notable alumni

 Charlotte Fry, Olympic medal winning dressage athlete
 Lee Morris, footballer
 Curtis Woodhouse, footballer  and boxer
 Mick Woodmansey, drummer

References

External links 
 School website

Secondary schools in the East Riding of Yorkshire
Educational institutions established in 1965
Academies in the East Riding of Yorkshire
1965 establishments in England
Driffield